Ergine, also known as d-lysergic acid amide (LSA) and d-lysergamide, is an ergoline alkaloid that occurs in various species of vines of the Convolvulaceae and some species of fungi. The psychedelic properties in the seeds of ololiuhqui, Hawaiian baby woodrose and morning glories have been linked to ergine and/or isoergine, its epimer, as it is an alkaloid present in the seeds.

Occurrence in nature
Ergine has been found in high concentrations of 20 μg/g dry weight in the sleepygrass infected with an Acremonium endophytic fungus together with other ergot alkaloids.

Ergine is a component of the alkaloids contained in the ergot fungus, which grows on the heads of infected rye grasses.

It is also found in the seeds of several varieties of morning glories in concentrations of approximately 10 μg per seed, as well as Hawaiian baby woodrose seeds, at a concentration of around 0.13% of dry weight.

History
Ololiuhqui was used by South American healers in shamanic healing ceremonies. Similarly, ingestion of morning glory seeds by Mazatec tribes to "commune with their gods" was reported by Richard Schultes in 1941 and is still practiced today.

Sewell RA. Entheogen Rev. 2008;16:117-25.

Additional reports of the use of ergine were made by Don Thomes MacDougall. He reported that the seeds of Ipomoea violacea were used as sacraments by certain Zapotecs, sometimes in conjunction with the seeds of Rivea corymbosa, another species which has a similar chemical composition, with lysergol instead of ergometrine.

Ergine was assayed for human activity by Albert Hofmann in self-trials in 1947, well before it was known to be a natural compound. Intramuscular administration of a 500 microgram dose led to a tired, dreamy state, with an inability to maintain clear thoughts. After a short period of sleep the effects were gone, and normal baseline was recovered within five hours.

In 1956, the Central Intelligence Agency conducted research on the psychedelic properties of the ergine in the seeds of Rivea corymbosa, as Subproject 22 of MKULTRA.

In 1959, Hofmann was the first to isolate chemically pure ergine from the seeds of Turbina corymbosa, determining that it, and other alkaloids, were acting as the main active components in the seeds. Twenty years prior to its isolation, ergine was first chemically defined by English chemists S. Smith and G. M. Timmis as the cleavage product of ergot alkaloids. Additionally, Guarin and Youngkin reportedly isolated the crude alkaloid in 1964 from morning glory seeds.

Ingestion
Like other psychedelics, ergine is not considered to be addictive. Additionally, there are no known deaths directly associated with pharmacological effects of ergine consumption. All associated deaths are due to indirect causes, such as self-harm, impaired judgement, and adverse drug interactions. One known case involved a suicide that was reported in 1964 after ingestion of morning glory seeds. Another instance is a death due to falling off of a building after ingestion of Hawaiian baby woodrose seeds and alcohol.

Physiological effects
While its physiological effects vary from person to person, the following symptoms have been attributed to the consumption of ergine or ergine containing seeds:

 Sedation
 Visual and auditory hallucinations
 Euphoria
 Loss of motor control
 Nausea
 Vasoconstriction
 Delusion
 Anxiety
 Paranoia
 Irregular heartbeat
 Sexual arousal
 Tachycardia
 Mydriasis
 Hypertonia
 Respiratory disturbances
 Cramps

One study found that 2 of 4 human subjects experienced cardiovascular dysregulation and the study had to be halted, concluding that the drug is more dangerous than commonly believed. The same study also observed that reactions were highly differing in type and intensity between different subjects. Another study in mice found that the drug had aphrodisiac properties, inducing increased sexual behavior.

A study gave mice 3000 mg/kg with no lethal effects.

Psychedelic component
Ergine is thought to be a serotonergic psychedelic and its psychedelic effects are thought to be due to it being a partial agonist of the 5-HT2A receptor. Though, the reason as to why this may be hallucinogenic remains elusive.

The idea that ergine is the main psychedelic component in ergine containing seeds (morning glory, Hawaiian baby woodrose) is well debated, as the effects of isolated synthetic ergine are reported to be only mildly psychedelic. Thus, the overall psychedelic experience after consumption of such seeds has been proposed to be due to a mixture of ergoline alkaloids.

Pharmacology

Pharmacodynamics

Ergine interacts with serotonin, dopamine, and adrenergic receptors similarly to but with lower affinity than lysergic acid diethylamide (LSD). The psychedelic effects of ergine can be attributed to activation of serotonin 5-HT2A receptors.

Chemistry

Biosynthesis

The biosynthetic pathway to ergine starts like most other ergoline alkaloid- with the formation of the ergoline scaffold. This synthesis starts with the prenylation of L-tryptophan in an SN1 fashion with dimethylallyl diphosphate (DMAPP) as the prenyl donor and catalyzed by prenyltransferase 4-dimethylallyltryptophan synthase (DMATS), to form 4-L-dimethylallyltryptophan (4-L-DMAT). The DMAPP is derived from mevalonic acid. A three strep mechanism is proposed to form 4-L-DMAT: the formation of an allylic carbocation, a nucleophilic attack of the indole nucleus to the cation, followed by deprotonation to restore aromaticity and to generate 4-L-DMAT. 4-Dimethylallyltyptophan N-methyltransferase (EasF) catalyzes the N-methylation of 4-L-DMAT at the amino of the tryptophan backbone, using S-Adenosyl methionine (SAM) as the methyl source, to form 4-dimethylallyl-L-abrine (4-DMA-L-abrine). The conversion of 4-DMA-L-abrine to chanoclavine-I is thought to occur through a decarboxylation and two oxidation steps, catalyzed by the FAD dependent oxidoreductase, EasE, and the catalase, EasC. The chanoclavine intermediate is then oxidized to chanoclavine-l-aldehyde, catalyzed by the short-chain dehydrogenase/reductase (SDR), EasD.

From here, the biosynthesis diverges and the products formed are plant and fungus-specific. The biosynthesis of ergine in Claviceps purpurea will be exemplified, in which agroclavine is produced following the formation of chanoclavine-l-aldehyde, catalyzed by EasA through a keto-enol tautomerization to facilitate rotation about the C-C bond, followed by tautomerization back to the aldehyde and condensation with the proximal secondary amine to form an iminium species, which is subsequently reduced to the tertiary amine and yielding argoclavine. Cytochrome P450 monooxygenases (CYP450) are then thought to catalyze the formation of elymoclavine from argoclavine via a 2 electron oxidation. This is further converted to paspalic acid via a 4 electron oxidation, catalyzed by cloA, a CYP450 monooxygenase. Paspalic acid then undergoes isomerization of the C-C double bond in conjugation with the acid to form D-lysergic acid. While the specifics of the formation of ergine from D-lysergic acid are not known, it is proposed to occur through a nonribosomal peptide synthase (NRPS) with two enzymes primarily involve: D-lysergyl peptide synthase (LPS) 1 and 2.

Legal status
The legality of consuming, cultivating, and possessing ergine varies depending on the country.

There are no laws against possession of ergine-containing seeds in the USA. However, possession of the pure compound without a prescription or DEA license would be prosecuted, as ergine, under the name "lysergic acid amide", is listed under Schedule III of the Controlled Substances Act. Similarly, ergine is considered a Class A substance in the United Kingdom, categorized as a precursor to LSD.

In most Australian states, the consumption of ergine containing materials is prohibited under state legislation.

In Canada, ergine is not illegal to possess as it is not listed under Canada's Controlled Drugs and Substances Act, though it is likely illegal to sell for human consumption.

In New Zealand, ergine is a controlled drug, however the plants and seeds of the morning glory species are legal to possess, cultivate, buy, and distribute.

See also 
Argyreia nervosa
 List of entheogenic/hallucinogenic species
 List of psychoactive plants
 Tlitliltzin (Ipomoea violacea)

References

Further reading

External links 
 Hofmann, A. Teonanácatl and Ololiuqui, two ancient magic drugs of Mexico Bulletin on Narcotics 1971 1 3
 TiHKAL (A & A Shulgin) #26
 LSA Vault – Erowid

Alkaloids found in fungi
Lysergamides
Plant toxins
Quinoline alkaloids
Serotonin receptor agonists
Tryptamine alkaloids
Vasoconstrictors